The PS/2E or Energy (IBM 9533) is a member of the IBM Personal System/2 family of personal computers (PCs). It was the first Energy Star-compliant PC, consuming very little power relative to other contemporary PCs, and made extensive use of recycled materials in its enclosure.

Specifications
The PS/2E featured an IBM 486SLC2 microprocessor with a 16KB L1 cache that ran at 50MHz on a 25MHz system bus (the processor clock was double that of the system bus). The processor's performance was dependent on the L1 cache containing the required instructions and data; there was no external L2 cache on the motherboard like on some other 486-based computers.

It featured an ISA bus for input/output, which accepted a single ISA option adapter with the use of a riser card. Depending on the sub-model number, it came supplied with either a special option adapter for four PC card PCMCIA slots, or a network interface card for Ethernet or Token Ring networks for use as a diskless workstation. Additional options included several PCMCIA cards, a color LCD screen, and a color LCD touch-screen with a special version of OS/2.

The PC borrowed some components from IBM's ThinkPad laptops: including the 1.44MB floppy disk drive and the hard disk drive. Its enclosure was composed of recycled plastics, and was designed to be easily recycled at the end of its service life. The power supply unit maximum power consumption was 24watts, and was completely passively cooled, and lacked a fan for that reason.

Design
The PS/2E featured a full-sized internal PC speaker, two SIMM sockets, and an extended bank of memory soldered directly to the motherboard. It featured 1MB of video memory for the onboard XGA-2 graphics adapter, which was attached to the ISA bus instead of the usual MCA bus. Like all Personal System/2 computers, if a change in hardware is performed, the configuration must be updated with the use of the reference diskette (for example changing the memory size).

References

External links
 Image of a PS/2 E with its LCD screen
 Image of a PS/2 E on its box
 A page with some pictures of the PS/2 inside
 IBM Announcement Letter Number 193-226 dated July 29, 1993
 IBM PC Institute - Personal Systems Reference - IBM PS/2 1992 to 1995 - withdrawn.

E
Computer-related introductions in 1993